Ode is an album by the London Jazz Composers' Orchestra composed by bassist Barry Guy and conducted by his teacher, Buxton Orr.  It was recorded as part of the English Bach Festival at the Oxford Town Hall in 1972 and first released as a double album on the Incus label then as a double CD on Intakt in 1996 with additional material.

Reception

The Allmusic review by Thom Jurek called it "among the most profound, hard-swinging, mind-bending exercises they've ever recorded" and states "the result is a stunning array of questions, colors, shapes, timbres, textures, and moods. For Guy to score such an intricate tome, opening up the orchestra is an artistic feat; for it to sound so approachable and welcoming to non-musicians, or those approaching the music tentatively or enthusiastically, Ode is a kind of miracle".

The Penguin Guide to Jazz identified the album as part of their suggested "Core Collection" of essential jazz albums and awarded the compilation a "Crown" signifying a recording that the authors "feel a special admiration or affection for".

Track listing
All compositions by Barry Guy.
 "Part I: Introduction - The End - Edgar Ende, 1931" - 8:58
 "Part II: Strophe I - Memory of the Future - Oscar Dominguez, 1939" - 8.56
 "Part III: Antistrophe I - Exact Sensibility - Oscar Dominguez, 1935" - 14.11
 "Part IV: Strophe II - Indefinite Indivisibility - Yves Tanguy, 1942" - 23.44 
 "Part V: Antistrophe II - According to the Laws of Chance - Jean Arp, 1917" - 10.56
 "Part VI: Epôde - Presence of Mind- René Magritte, 1958" - 19.00
 "Part VII: Coda - Melancholy Departure - Georgio de Chirico, 1916" - 11.48 Bonus track on CD reissue

Personnel
Barry Guy - bass, composer
Buxton Orr - conductor
Harry Beckett, Dave Holdsworth - trumpet
Marc Charig - cornet
Mike Gibbs, Paul Nieman, Paul Rutherford - trombone
Dick Hart - tuba
Trevor Watts - alto saxophone, soprano saxophone
Bernhard Living, Mike Osborne - alto saxophone
Evan Parker, Alan Wakeman - soprano saxophone, tenor saxophone
Bob Downes - flute, tenor saxophone
Karl Jenkins - baritone saxophone, oboe
Howard Riley - piano
Derek Bailey - guitar
Jeff Clyne, Chris Laurence - bass
Paul Lytton, Tony Oxley - percussion

References

Live free improvisation albums
Incus Records live albums
Barry Guy live albums
1972 live albums